Nicholas Michael Gilbert (born 20 July 1965) is a former Canadian Soccer League high-scoring soccer striker and Canada men's national soccer team member.

Club career
His first semi-professional experience came as a member of the Victoria Riptides. Gilbert was the Canadian Soccer League's inaugural Most Valuable Player selection as he led the league in goals in 1987 as a member of the Calgary Kickers, with 10. He was the 6th leading goal scoring in 1988 with 11 as he split time between Calgary and the Toronto Blizzard. In the league's 7-year existence Gilbert was its 7th all-time highest goal scorer with 36. Gilbert played four games for the Vancouver 86ers in 1993, all starts, and scored a goal, on 30 July in a 2–1 win over the Montreal Impact.

Gilbert was a long-time member of Victoria United of the Pacific Coast Soccer League. He finished tied for third in the league's 2000 goal scoring leaders with 7. He played for the Victoria Athletic Association of the Vancouver Island Soccer League in 2000–1, apparently while stay playing for United. Gilbert left United to join PCSL rival Seattle Hibernian Saints in July 2002.

International career

Gilbert first played for the national team in the 1984 CONCACAF Under-20 Championship, in a tournament in which Canada finished runners-up. He earned his first senior cap as a 22-year-old in a February 1988 friendly played in Hamilton, Bermuda that ended scoreless, and his last one in September 1992 in a 0–2 loss to the United States, a friendly played in Saint John, New Brunswick. Gilbert earned a total of 10 caps and scored once for Canada.

International goals
Scores and results list Canada's goal tally first.

Honours
Canadian Soccer League: 1
 1987
Canadian Soccer League Top Goalscorer: 1
 1987

References

External links

Western Alliance Challenge Series 1985 Season
American Professional Soccer League 1993 Season
APSL 1993 Season results
Transactions – New York Times

Trophy Case of the Vancouver Island Soccer League
 

1965 births
Living people
Soccer players from Vancouver
Association football forwards
Canadian soccer players
Canada men's youth international soccer players
Canada men's international soccer players
1991 CONCACAF Gold Cup players
Canadian expatriate soccer players
Canadian expatriate sportspeople in the United States
Victoria Riptides players
Calgary Kickers players
Toronto Blizzard (1986–1993) players
Vancouver Whitecaps (1986–2010) players
Seattle Hibernian players
Western Soccer Alliance players
Canadian Soccer League (1987–1992) players
American Professional Soccer League players
Pacific Coast Soccer League players
Expatriate soccer players in the United States
Edmonton Brick Men players
Winnipeg Fury players